Dimitri Alexandre Nils Kongbo (born 8 October 1987) is a French-born Central African professional basketball player who last played for Union des Clubs Anneciens of the Nationale Masculine 2 (NM2) in France.

International career 
Kongbo competed for the Central African Republic national basketball team in the qualifying rounds of the AfroBasket 2015. On June 26, 2015, he was named to the team's preliminary squad for the official event by head coach Aubin-Thierry Goporo.

References

External links 
Dimitri Kongbo at Eurobasket.com

Living people
1987 births
Centers (basketball)
Citizens of the Central African Republic through descent
Central African Republic men's basketball players
French men's basketball players
French sportspeople of Central African Republic descent
Black French sportspeople
Basketball players from Paris